Walter Bishop Jr. (October 4, 1927 – January 24, 1998) was an American jazz pianist.

Early life
Bishop was born in New York City on October 4, 1927. He had at least two sisters, Marian and Beverly. His father was composer Walter Bishop Sr. In his teens, Bishop Jr.'s friends included future jazz musicians Kenny Drew, Sonny Rollins, and Art Taylor. He was brought up in Harlem. He left high school to play in dance bands in the area. In 1945–47 he was in the Army Air Corps. During his military service in 1947 Bishop was based near St Louis and met touring bebop musicians.

Later life and career
Later in 1947, he returned to New York. That year (or 1949) he was part of drummer Art Blakey's band for 14 weeks and recorded with them. Bishop developed his bebop playing in part by playing in jam sessions at Minton's Playhouse.

He recorded with Milt Jackson and Stan Getz in 1949, then played with Charlie Parker (1951–54), Oscar Pettiford, Kai Winding, and Miles Davis (1951–53). At this time he was also a drug addict, which led to imprisonment and the withdrawal of his New York City Cabaret Card. In 1956, he recorded with Hank Mobley. According to the New Grove Dictionary of Jazz, "at some point he became a Muslim and took the name Ibrahim ibn Ismail, but he did not use this publicly." In the early 1960s he also led his own trio with Jimmy Garrison and G. T. Hogan.

After studying at The Juilliard School with Hall Overton in the late 1960s, Bishop taught music theory at colleges in Los Angeles in the 1970s. At some point prior to moving from New York to Los Angeles, Bishop met and married the former Valerie Isabel Paul. They then moved to Los Angeles.  According Jay Blotcher, Valerie Bishop's son from a previous relationship, after divorcing Walter Bishop in the mid-1970s, Valerie Bishop worked as an assistant for Ike and Tina Turner in California. Valerie Bishop was cited by Tina Turner in Turner's memoir I, Tina as the person who inspired Turner to pursue Buddhism.

In the 1980s, Bishop taught at the University of Hartford. By this time, he made frequent appearances at clubs and festivals in New York. He also wrote a book, A Study in Fourths, about jazz improvisation based on cycles of fourths and fifths. His debut recording as a leader was in the 1960s. He continued performing into the 1990s.

Bishop died of a heart attack at the Veterans Affairs Medical Center in Manhattan on January 24, 1998. He was survived by his wife, Keiko; his mother, and two sisters.

Playing style
Bishop was influenced at an early stage by Bud Powell. Later, Bishop was "known for holding back on the beat, a device that added tension to the music."

Discography

As leader

Compilation
1965 The Walter Bishop Jr. Trio / 1965 (Prestige), compiles A Pair of "Naturals" and Summertime

As sideman
With Gene Ammons
Up Tight! (Prestige, 1961)
Boss Soul! (Prestige, 1961)
With Shorty Baker and Doc Cheatham
Shorty & Doc (Swingville, 1961)
With Art Blakey
Blakey (EmArcy, 1954)
Art Blakey Big Band (Bethlehem, 1957)
With Rocky Boyd
Ease It (Jazztime, 1961)
'With Miles DavisDig (Prestige, 1951)
Collectors' Items (Prestige, 1956)
With Kenny Dorham
Kenny Dorham Quintet (Debut, 1953)
Inta Somethin' (Pacific Jazz, 1961)
With Curtis Fuller
Boss of the Soul-Stream Trombone (Warwick, 1960)
The Magnificent Trombone of Curtis Fuller (Epic, 1961)
Fire and Filigree (Bee Hive, 1978)
With John Handy
Jazz (Roulette, 1962)
With Bill Hardman
Focus (Muse, 1980 [1984])
Politely (Muse, 1981 [1982])
With Milt Jackson
Meet Milt Jackson (Savoy, 1949)
With Ken McIntyre
Looking Ahead (New Jazz, 1960)
With Jackie McLean
Swing, Swang, Swingin' (Blue Note, 1959)
Capuchin Swing (Blue Note, 1961)
With Blue Mitchell
Blue Mitchell (Mainstream, 1971)
Vital Blue (Mainstream, 1971)
With Hank Mobley
Mobley's 2nd Message (Prestige, 1956)
With Charlie Parker
Swedish Schnapps (Verve 1951) side 2
Fiesta (Verve 1952)
Charlie Parker Plays Cole Porter (Verve, 1954)
Live at Rockland Palace (Parker Records, 1952 [1983])

With Oscar Pettiford
The New Oscar Pettiford Sextet (Debut, 1953)
With Dizzy Reece
Soundin' Off (Blue Note, 1960)
With Charlie Rouse
Takin' Care of Business (Jazzland, 1960)
With Archie Shepp
On Green Dolphin Street (Denon, 1978)
With Sonny Stitt
Broadway Soul (Colpix, 1965)
With Harold Vick
Commitment (Muse, 1967 [1974])
With Stan Getz Zoot Sims etc.
The Brothers (Prestige, 1949)

References

External links
 
 MusicWeb Encyclopaedia of Popular Music

African-American jazz pianists
Bebop pianists
1927 births
1998 deaths
Jazz musicians from California
Jazz musicians from New York (state)
Juilliard School alumni
University of Hartford Hartt School faculty
Black Jazz Records artists
Muse Records artists
Xanadu Records artists
DIW Records artists
Prestige Records artists
American male jazz musicians
American jazz pianists
American male pianists
20th-century American pianists
20th-century American male musicians
Black Lion Records artists
20th-century African-American musicians